América, also América, A Portuguese Story is a 2010 Portuguese-Russian drama film, directed, written, co-produced and co-edited by the Portuguese director João Nuno Pinto. It is a story about illegal immigration, crime and drug dealing. It marked the debut of director João Nuno Pinto and the actor Manuel Custódia.

The film premiered at the 2010 Festival de Cine Iberoamericano de Huelva.

Cast 
Chulpan Khamatova - Liza
Fernando Luís - Vitor
María Barranco - Fernanda
Manuel Custódia - Mauro
Dinarte Branco - Paulo Armando
Cassiano Carneiro - Matias
Raul Solnado - Melo 
Mikhail Evlanov - Andrei
Francisco 'Paco' Maestre - Tolentino
Nikolai Glinskiy - Aleksander

References

External links
 

2010 films
2010 drama films
Portuguese drama films
Russian drama films